Madame Thomas Nkumu, née Joséphine Siongo was a Congolese local politician. She was the first Congolese woman to sit on Léopoldville's city council.

Nkumu became Léopoldville's first woman city councillor in 1956. In 1957 she was appointed the Congolese delegate to the World Union of Catholic Women’s Organizations. After visiting Belgium she reported on the remarkable way in which a Belgian husband and wife behaved as "one item":

Though there was an implicit contrast here with traditional views of women's domestic responsibilities, Nkumu did not distance herself from these:

References

Year of birth missing
Possibly living people
Belgian Congo people
20th-century Democratic Republic of the Congo women politicians
20th-century Democratic Republic of the Congo politicians